Sophienkirche, was a church in Dresden, Germany

Sophienkirche may also refer to:

 Sophienkirche (Bayreuth), church in Bayreuth, Germany
 Sophienkirche (Berlin), church in Berlin, Germany